The men's doubles squash event of the 2015 Pan American Games was held from July 13–14 at the Exhibition Centre in Toronto. The defending Pan American Games champion are Arturo Salazar and Eric Gálvez of Mexico.

Schedule
All times are Central Standard Time (UTC-6).

Results

Finals

Top Half

Bottom Half

Final standings

References

External links 
 Results on squashsite.co.uk

Squash at the 2015 Pan American Games